The 2003 Nigerian Senate election in Anambra State was held on April 12, 2003, to elect members of the Nigerian Senate to represent Anambra State. Ugochukwu Uba representing Anambra South, Emmanuel Anosike representing Anambra North and Ikechukwu Abana representing Anambra Central all won on the platform of the Peoples Democratic Party.

Overview

Summary

Results

Anambra South 
The election was won by Ugochukwu Uba of the Peoples Democratic Party.

Anambra North 
The election was won by Emmanuel Anosike of the Peoples Democratic Party.

Anambra Central 
The election was won by Ikechukwu Abana of the Peoples Democratic Party.

References 

April 2003 events in Nigeria
Anambra State Senate elections
Ana